was the first concubine of Emperor Meiji, and the mother of his first child Wakamitsuteru-hiko no Mikoto (稚瑞照彦尊). Wakamitsuteru-hiko no Mikoto was stillborn, and Mitsuko died of complications from his delivery five days later. Mitsuko was assisted in the delivery by Kusumoto Ine, the first woman doctor of western medical training in Japan.

Mitsuko's tomb is at Toshimagaoka Imperial Cemetery at Gokoku-ji in Bunkyo, Tokyo.

See also
Empress Shōken, primary consort of Emperor Meiji, later Empress Dowager
Hashimoto Natsuko, second concubine
Yanagihara Naruko, third concubine of Emperor Meiji, mother of Emperor Taishō
Chigusa Kotoko (千種任子), fourth concubine
Sono Sachiko, fifth concubine

References 

Imperial House of Japan
1853 births
1873 deaths
Japanese concubines
Emperor Meiji
Deaths in childbirth